This list is of the Intangible Cultural Properties of Japan in the Prefecture of Hyōgo.

National Cultural Properties
As of 1 July 2015, four Important Intangible Cultural Properties have been designated, being of national significance.

Performing Arts

Craft Techniques

Prefectural Cultural Properties
As of 1 May 2014, four properties have been designated at a prefectural level.

Performing Arts

Craft Techniques

Municipal Cultural Properties
As of 1 May 2014, five properties have been designated at a municipal level.

Intangible Cultural Properties that need measures such as making records
As of 1 May 2014, there were two .

Craft Techniques

References

External links
  Cultural Properties in Hyogo Prefecture

Culture in Hyōgo Prefecture
Hyogo